In theoretical physics, the term dressed particle refers to a bare particle together with some excitations of other quantum fields that are physically inseparable from the bare particle. For example, a dressed electron includes the cloud of virtual electron–positron pairs and photons surrounding the original electron.

A further noteworthy example is represented by polaritons in solid-state physics, dressed quasiparticles of dipolar excitations in a medium with photons.

In radiobiology, a dressed particle is a bare particle together with its Debye sphere that neutralizes its electric charge.
Dressed particles are also often called clothed particles.

See also
 Constituent quark

References

Theoretical physics
Quantum field theory